Rajeshwar  is a village in the southern state of Karnataka, India. It is located in the Basavakalyan taluk of Bidar district in Karnataka, which is on NH-9. Rajeshwar has big "Ram Linga Swamy" temple. Rajeshwar is 16 kilometres away from its taluka Basavakalyan, 66 kilometres from Bidar and 76 kilometres from Kalaburagi.

Demographics
 India census, Rajeshwar had a population of 16343 with 7213 males and 6790 females.

HOW TO REACH Rajeshwar 
Humnabad is nearest town to Rajeshwar which is 10 kilometres away.

See also
 Bidar
Basavakalyan
 Districts of Karnataka

References

External links
 http://Bidar.nic.in/

Villages in Bidar district